Zale duplicata, the pine false looper zale, pine false looper, banded similar-wing or grey similar-wing, is a moth of the family Noctuidae. The species was first described by Charles J. S. Bethune in 1865. It is found in woodlands and forests from British Columbia to Nova Scotia, south to the mountains of Georgia and Texas.

The wingspan is 34–36 mm. Adults are on wing from late May to June in Alberta. There is one generation per year.

The larvae feed on eastern white pine from New Brunswick to North Carolina. North and westward it is reported to on various other pines, including both hard (two- and three-needled species) and soft pines (usually five-needled species). The larvae of ssp. largera feed on jack pine exclusively.

Subspecies
Zale duplicata duplicata
Zale duplicata largera (J. B. Smith, 1908)

External links

"Pine False Looper (Zale duplicata)". Forest Pests. Archived October 31, 2007. With larval stage info.

Catocalinae
Moths of North America
Moths described in 1865